Baza-Kuyanovo (Baźı-Quyan) is a rural locality (a village) in Dyumeyevsky Selsoviet, Ilishevsky District, Bashkortostan, Russia. The population was 122 as of 2010. There is 1 street.

Geography 
Baza-Kuyanovo is located 27 km south of Verkhneyarkeyevo (the district's administrative centre) by road. Dyumeyevo is the nearest rural locality.

References 

Rural localities in Ilishevsky District